Kallang Tennis Centre is a tennis court in Kallang, Singapore. It is located along Stadium Boulevard, adjacent to the Kallang Field, and is part of the Kallang Sports Centre. It is located just outside the central business district area.

History
The Kallang Tennis Centre was opened as a community sports facility in March 1978. Since then, it has been a popular venue for tennis programmes and competitions, including hosting the local national schools’ tennis competitions. It is also the training venue for the national team and national youth teams.

The Kallang Tennis Centre is equipped with 14 courts.

2010 Summer Youth Olympics
Kallang Tennis Centre was used as a competition venue for tennis during the 2010 Summer Youth Olympics.

Temporary seating stands for 2,000 were built around the main court for fans and the media during the Singapore 2010 Youth Olympic Games.

Notes and references

Kallang
Tennis venues in Singapore
Venues of the 2010 Summer Youth Olympics
Sports venues completed in 1978
1978 establishments in Singapore
20th-century architecture in Singapore